Lake siding is a settlement located south west of Deer Lake. It had a population of 146 in 1951, but has been a part of the greater Deer Lake area for many years and no longer reports separately.

See also
 List of communities in Newfoundland and Labrador

Populated places in Newfoundland and Labrador